The following is a timeline of the history of the city of Tegucigalpa, Honduras.

Prior to 20th century

 1561 - Roman Catholic diocese of Comayagua established
 1578 -  Silver mines discovered
 1786 - Tegucigalpa Cathedral building completed.
 1812 - Political unrest.
 1821 - Tegucigalpa attains city status.
 1822 - Mallol Bridge built
 1877 - Telegraph begins operating.
 1880 - Tegucigalpa becomes capital of Honduras.
 1889 -  founded

20th century
 1905 - Population: about 35,000.
 1907 - Tegucigalpa was occupied by Nicaraguan invaders.
 1912
 El Cronista newspaper begins publication.
 Club Deportivo Olimpia (football club) formed.
 1915 -  (theatre) opens.
 1920 - Population: 38,950.
 1928 - Club Deportivo Motagua (football club) formed.
 1934 - Toncontín Airport begins operating.
 1937 - Distrito Central created.
 1946 - American School of Tegucigalpa established.
 1948 - Estadio Tiburcio Carías Andino (stadium) opens.
 1950 - Population: 72,385 city; 99,948 urban agglomeration.
 1961 - Population: 164,941.
 1973 - Population: 274,850 city; 302,483 urban agglomeration.
 1977 - La Tribuna newspaper begins publication.
 1984 - Military leader "Alvarez is deposed amid anti-American demonstrations in Tegucigalpa."
 1986 - Population: 597,512 (estimate).
 1989
 25 January: Alvarez assassinated.
 21 October: Airplane crash.
 1993 - El Periódico newspaper begins publication.
 1998 - October: Hurricane Mitch occurs.

21st century

 2003 - Population: 858,437.
 2009 - 28 June: 2009 Honduran coup d'état.
 2011 -  hi-rise built.(es)
 2013 - Population: 1,157,509.
 2014 - Nasry Asfura becomes mayor.

See also
 Tegucigalpa history

References

This article incorporates information from the Spanish Wikipedia.

Bibliography

in English

in Spanish

External links

 Map of Tegucigalpa, 1984
 Items related to Tegucigalpa, various dates (via Digital Public Library of America)
 Items related to Tegucigalpa, various dates (via Europeana)

.
Tegucigalpa
Tegucigalpa
Honduras-related lists
Years in Honduras
Tegucigalpa